Tour Maine-Montparnasse (Maine-Montparnasse Tower), also commonly named Tour Montparnasse, is a  office skyscraper located in the Montparnasse area of Paris, France. Constructed from 1969 to 1973, it was the tallest skyscraper in France until 2011, when it was surpassed by the  Tour First. It remains the tallest building in Paris outside the La Défense business district. , it is the 17th-tallest building in the European Union.

The tower was designed by architects Eugène Beaudouin, Urbain Cassan, and Louis Hoym de Marien and built by Campenon Bernard. On 21 September 2017, Nouvelle AOM won a competition to redesign the building's facade.

Description

Built on top of the Montparnasse–Bienvenüe Paris Métro station, the building has 59 floors.

The 56th floor, 200 metres (600') from the ground, is home to Paris Montparnasse, an observation deck owned by Magnicity, a French company which also operates the Berlin TV Tower in Berlin and 360 CHICAGO at the former John Hancock Center in Chicago. Visitors to the observation deck can also visit the scenic rooftop terrace or make reservations for the 56th-floor restaurant called Ciel de Paris.

The guard rail, to which various antennae are attached, can be pneumatically lowered.

History

The project
In 1934, the old Montparnasse station located on the edges of the similarly named boulevard, opposite the Rue de Rennes, appeared ill-suited to traffic. The city of Paris planned to reorganize the district and build a new station. But the project, entrusted to Raoul Dautry (who would give his name to the square of the tower), met strong opposition and was cancelled.

In 1956, on the occasion of the adoption of the new master plan for the Paris traffic plan, the Société d'économie mixte pour l'Aménagement du secteur Maine Montparnasse (SEMMAM) was created, as well as the l'Agence pour l'Opération Maine Montparnasse (AOM). Their mission was to redevelop the neighbourhood, which required razing many streets, often dilapidated and unsanitary. The site then occupied up to 8 hectares.

In 1958, the first studies of the tower were well launched, but the project was strongly criticized because of the height of the building. A controversy ensued, led by the Minister of Public Works Edgard Pisani, who obtained the support of André Malraux, then Minister of Culture under General de Gaulle which led to slowdowns in the project.

However, the reconstruction of the Montparnasse station a few hundred meters (yards) south of the old one and the destruction of the Gare du Maine, which was included in the real estate project of the AOM, a joint agency which brought together the four architects: Urbain Cassan, Eugène Beaudouin and Louis de Hoÿm de Marien, was carried out from June 1966 to the spring of 1969 with the assistance of the architect Jean Saubot.

In 1968, André Malraux granted the building permit for the Tower to the AOM and work began that same year. The project was spearheaded by the American real estate developer Wylie Tuttle, who enlisted a consortium of 17 French insurance companies and seven banks in the $140-million multiple-building project, but later distanced himself from the project until his 2002 obituary revealed that the building was his original "brainchild".

In 1969, the decision to build a shopping centre was finally made, and Georges Pompidou, then President of the Republic, wanted to provide the capital with modern infrastructure. Despite a major controversy, the construction of the tower was started.

For geographer Anne Clerval, this construction symbolizes the service economy of Paris in the 1970s resulting from deindustrialization policies which, from the 1960s, favoured "bypassing by space the most working class strongholds at the time".

Construction
The Montparnasse tower was built between 1969 and 1973 on the site of the old Montparnasse station. The first stone was laid in 1970 and the inauguration took place in 1973.

The foundations of the tower are made up of 56 reinforced concrete pillars sinking 70 meters (200') underground. For urban planning reasons, the tower had to be built just above a metro line; and to avoid using the same support and weakening it, the metro structures were protected by a reinforced concrete shield. On the other hand, long horizontal beams were installed in order to free up the space needed in the basement to fit out the tracks for trains.

Occupation
The tower is mainly occupied by offices. Various companies and organizations have settled in the tower:

 The International Union of Architects, Axa and MMA insurers, the mining and metallurgy company Eramet, Al Jazeera
 Political parties have used campaign offices, such as François Mitterrand in 1974, the RPR in the late 70s, Emmanuel Macron's La République En Marche! in 2016, Benoît Hamon since 2018
Previously Tour Maine-Montparnasse housed the executive management of Accor.

The 56th floor, with its terrace, bars and restaurant, has been used for private or public events. During the 80s and 90s, the live National Lottery was cast on TF1 from the 56th floor.

Climbing the tower
French urban climber Alain "Spiderman" Robert, using only his bare hands and feet and with no safety devices of any kind, scaled the building's exterior glass and steel wall to the top twice, in 1995 and in 2015.

His achievement was repeated by Polish climber Marcin Banot in 2020. From the middle of the way he was followed by a lifeguard on a rope but Marcin refused to connect a safety rope and climbed to the top without any help.

Criticism
The tower's simple architecture, large proportions and monolithic appearance have been often criticized by Parisians for being out of place in Paris's landscape. As a result, two years after its completion the construction of buildings over seven stories high in the city center was banned in Paris. This ban was lifted in 2015.

The design of the tower predates architectural trends of more modern skyscrapers today that are often designed to provide a window for every office. Only the offices around the perimeter of each floor of Tour Montparnasse have windows.

It is said that the tower's observation deck enjoys the most beautiful view in all of Paris because it is the only place from which the tower cannot be seen.

A 2008 poll of editors on Virtualtourist voted the building the second-ugliest building in the world, behind Boston City Hall in the United States.

Asbestos contamination
In 2005, studies showed that the tower contained asbestos material. When inhaled, for instance during repairs, asbestos is a carcinogen. Monitoring revealed that legal limits of fibers per liter were surpassed and, on at least one occasion, reached 20 times the legal limit. Due to health and legal concerns, some tenants abandoned  their offices in the building.

The problem of removing the asbestos material from a large building used by thousands of people is unique. The projected completion time for removal was cited as three years. After a nearly three-year delay, removal began in 2009 alongside regular operation of the building. In 2012, it was reported the Maine-Montparnasse Tower was 90% free of asbestos.

Gallery

See also

 List of tallest buildings and structures in the Paris region

References

External links

 
 Photos of Tour Montparnasse
 Tour Montparnasse
 Pictures and info

Buildings and structures in the 15th arrondissement of Paris
Buildings and structures in Paris
Montparnasse
Office buildings completed in 1972
Montparnasse
Tourist attractions in Paris
20th-century architecture in France